Mauro Daniel Quiroga (born 7 December 1989) is an Argentine professional footballer who plays as a striker for Argentine club Platense. He is popularly known by his nickname "Comandante".

Club career
Born in Concepción del Uruguay, Entre Ríos Province, Quiroga began playing football with Gimnasia y Esgrima de Concepción del Uruguay before making a move to Europe, where he spent two seasons in Segunda División with UD Las Palmas, both on loan.

In late July 2012, Quiroga signed for another club in the Spanish second level, freshly promoted CD Lugo. Roughly a year later he joined Deportivo Alavés, still in the second tier.

In July 2014, Quiroga moved to Atlético de Rafaela, making his Argentine Primera División debut on 13 September by featuring 12 minutes in a 1–0 home win against Estudiantes de La Plata.

On 9 July 2019 Club Necaxa confirmed, that they had signed Quiroga.

Honours
Individual
Liga MX Golden Boot (Shared): Apertura 2019

References

External links

1989 births
Living people
Sportspeople from Entre Ríos Province
Argentine footballers
Argentine expatriate footballers
Association football forwards
Argentine Primera División players
Primera Nacional players
Atlético de Rafaela footballers
San Martín de Tucumán footballers
Argentinos Juniors footballers
Segunda División players
UD Las Palmas players
CD Lugo players
Deportivo Alavés players
Chilean Primera División players
Curicó Unido footballers
Liga MX players
Club Necaxa footballers
Atlético San Luis footballers
C.F. Pachuca players
C.S. Emelec footballers
Club Atlético Platense footballers
Argentine expatriate sportspeople in Spain
Argentine expatriate sportspeople in Chile
Argentine expatriate sportspeople in Mexico
Argentine expatriate sportspeople in Ecuador
Expatriate footballers in Spain
Expatriate footballers in Chile
Expatriate footballers in Mexico
Expatriate footballers in Ecuador